The 2008–09 Houston Cougars men's basketball team, also known as the Houston Cougars, Houston, or UH, represented the University of Houston in the college basketball 2008–09 season.  It was their 64th year of season play.  The head coach for the Cougars was Tom Penders, who was serving in his 5th year in that position.  The team played its home games at Hofheinz Pavilion on-campus in Houston, Texas.  The Cougars played in the first game of the NCAA Division I season in the 2K Sports College Classic.

Pre-season
The 2007–08 Cougars finished with a 24–10 record, and were invited to compete in the inaugural College Basketball Invitational (CBI).  Houston defeated Nevada and Valparaiso, but was defeated in the semifinals by Conference USA rival Tulsa.

Schedule

|-
!colspan=7|2K Sports College Classic

|-
!colspan=7|Regular season

|-
!colspan=7|Conference USA men's basketball tournament

|-
!colspan=7|College Basketball Invitational

Roster

References

Houston
Houston Cougars men's basketball seasons
Houston
Houston
Houston